Belchamp St Paul is a village and civil parish in the Braintree district of Essex, England.

The parish is northwest of Belchamp Otten and Belchamp Walter, in the parliamentary constituency of Braintree, and part of the Stour Valley. It had a population of 331 (2011 census). The parish includes the hamlet of Knowl Green.

Arthur Golding, the 16th-century poet, grew up at the manor and is buried in the churchyard of St Andrew's; a memorial to him is within the church. General Sir Timothy Creasey KCB OBE, a British Army officer who became General Officer Commanding of the British Army in Northern Ireland, and the commander of the Sultan of Oman's Armed Forces, is buried in the churchyard.

The church has a ring of 6 bells. https://dove.cccbr.org.uk/detail.php?tower=16317

The Half Moon public house was the location for a number of pub scenes in the BBC drama series Lovejoy.

Belchamp St Paul is the scene of the climax of M.R. James' ghost story Count Magnus.

References

External links
 

Braintree District
Villages in Essex